The 2003 PGA Championship was the 85th PGA Championship, held from August 14–17 at the East Course of Oak Hill Country Club near Rochester, New York. Shaun Micheel won his only major title, two strokes ahead of runner-up Chad Campbell. It was also the sole  career win for Micheel on the PGA Tour, who was making his 164th PGA Tour start and was ranked 169th in the world at the start of the week.

This was the fifth major at the East Course, which previously hosted the PGA Championship in 1980, and the U.S. Open in 1956, 1968, and 1989. It also hosted the Ryder Cup in 1995; the PGA Championship returned in 2013.

The first round of the tournament was briefly interrupted by the Northeast blackout of 2003.

Course layout

East Course

Previous course lengths for major championships
  - par 70, 1989 U.S. Open
  - par 70, 1980 PGA Championship
  - par 70, 1968 U.S. Open
  - par 70, 1956 U.S. Open

Round summaries

First round
Thursday, August 14, 2003

Second round
Friday, August 15, 2003

Third round
Saturday, August 16, 2003

Final round
Sunday, August 17, 2003

Source:

Scorecard
Final round

Cumulative tournament scores, relative to par

Source:

References

External links
2003 PGA Championship official site
Coverage on European Tour's official site

PGA Championship
Golf in New York (state)
Sports in Rochester, New York
PGA Championship
PGA Championship
PGA Championship
Events in Rochester, New York